de Saint-Pierre is a French surname. Notable people with the surname include:

 Charles-Irénée Castel de Saint-Pierre (1658-1743), influential French writer and radical
 Jacques Legardeur de Saint-Pierre (1701-1755), French military leader
 Jacques-Henri Bernardin de Saint-Pierre (1737-1814), French writer and botanist

French-language surnames